Ronald Wayne Wheeler (born September 5, 1958) is a former American football tight end who played in the National Football League (NFL), the Canadian Football League (CFL) and the United States Football League (USFL). He played college football at Washington.

College career
Wheeler began his collegiate career at Merritt College before transferring to the University of Washington after his sophomore year. In 1979 he played in 11 games for the Huskies and caught two passes for ten yards.

Professional career
Wheeler was signed by the Oakland Raiders as an undrafted free agent in 1981, but was released at the end of training camp. He was signed by the Cleveland Browns in 1982 but spent the entire season on injured reserve after injuring his knee in training camp. 

Wheeler was signed by the Oakland Invaders of the United States Football League (USFL) in 1983 and caught 5 passes for 32 yards during the season. He was selected by the Oklahoma Outlaws in the 1984 USFL Expansion Draft and was Oklahoma's starting tight end, leading the team with 51 receptions along with 651 yards and two touchdowns. Wheeler stayed with the team after the merged with the Arizona Wranglers the following season to become the Arizona Outlaws and had 35 receptions for 487 yards and five touchdowns. 

He started 1987 as a member of the Calgary Stampeders of the Canadian Football League and had 22 receptions for 340 yards and one touchdown. He left the team and was signed by the Los Angeles Raiders in October 1987 as a replacement player during the 1987 NFL players strike and caught three passes for 61 yards before being released when the strike ended.

References

1958 births
Living people
Players of American football from California
American football tight ends
Washington Huskies football players
Calgary Stampeders players
Los Angeles Raiders players
Arizona Outlaws players
Oakland Raiders players
Cleveland Browns players
Oklahoma Outlaws players